David Metzenthen (born 1958) is an Australian writer for children and young adults who was born in Melbourne, Victoria.

After completing his schooling in Melbourne, Metzenthen traveled to New Zealand where he held a variety of jobs. After returning to Australia he worked as a copywriter for Radio 3DB, for Grundy Television and for Myer before deciding to write full-time.

He now lives in Melbourne with his wife and two children.

Bibliography

Novels

 Lee Spain (1991)
 Johnny Hart's Heroes (1996)
 Finn and the Big Guy (1997)
 Falling Forward (1998)
 Gilbert's Ghost Train (1998)
 Mick the Mimic (1998)
 The Red Hot Footy Fiasco (1998)
 Stony Heart Country (1999)
 The Colour of Sunshine (2000)
 Wildlight: A Journey (2002)
 Boys of Blood and Bone (2003)
 Tiff and the Trout (2004)
 Blackwater (2007)
 Jarvis 24 (2009)
 Tigerfish (2014)
 Dreaming the Enemy (2016)

Novellas
 Roadie (1995)
 Animal Instinct (1996)

Children's fiction
 Brocky's Bananagram (1994)
 Cody and Zero (1997)
 The Diary of Fat Robbie Pile (1997)
 Lefty Lemon Kicks Goals (1997)
 Fort Island (1998)
 Adrian Over the Top (1999)
 Adrian Goes Out There (1999)
 The Red Boxing Gloves (2002)
 The Really Really High Diving Board (2003)
 Spider! (2004)
 Time Turns on Spooky Hill (2004)
 Anton Rocks On (2004)
 Roller-Coaster (2005)
 The Really Really Epic Mini Bike Ride (2006)
 Winning the World Cup (2007)
 The Really Nearly Deadly Canoe Ride (2009)
 Hide that Horse! (2009)
 Squidnapped! (2010)
 Save Our Sharks (2012)
 Freda the Free-Range Chook (2012)

Picture books
 The Rainbirds (2006) illustrated by Sally Rippin
 One Minute's Silence (2014) illustrated by Michael Camilleri

Critical studies and reviews of Metzenthen's work

Awards
 1996 winner New South Wales Premier's Literary Awards — Ethel Turner Prize for Young People's Literature — The Ethel Turner Prize for Children's Writing — Johnny Hart's Heroes
 1997 honour book Children's Book Council Book of the Year Awards — Book of the Year: Older Readers — Johnny Hart's Heroes
 1998 honour book Children's Book Council Book of the Year Awards — Book of the Year: Older Readers — Gilbert's Ghost Train
 2003 winner Victorian Premier's Literary Awards — Prize for Young Adult Fiction — Wildlight: A Journey
 2003 winner Queensland Premier's Literary Awards — Best Young Adult Book — Boys of Blood and Bone
 2004 honour book Children's Book Council Book of the Year Awards — Book of the Year: Older Readers — Boys of Blood and Bone
 2007 honour book Children's Book Council Book of the Year Awards — Picture Book of the Year — The Rainbirds
 2008 honour book Children's Book Council Book of the Year Awards — Book of the Year: Older Readers — Black Water
 2010 winner Children's Book Council Book of the Year Awards — Book of the Year: Older Readers — Jarvis
 2015 honour book Children's Book Council Book of the Year Awards — Picture Book of the Year — One Minute's Silence
 2016 winner Queensland Literary Awards — Griffith University Young Adult Book Award — Dreaming the Enemy

References

1958 births
Australian children's writers
Writers from Melbourne
Living people
Australian expatriates in New Zealand